Sam Slyfield (May 11, 1898 – January 15, 1974) was an American sound engineer. He was nominated for four Academy Awards in the category Best Sound Recording.

Selected filmography
 Bambi (1942)
 Saludos Amigos (1942)
 The Three Caballeros (1944)
 Cinderella (1950)

References

External links

1898 births
1974 deaths
American audio engineers
Walt Disney Animation Studios people
Academy Award for Technical Achievement winners